Matogjin is a village in Vlorë County, southern Albania. At the 2015 local government reform it became part of the municipality Selenicë.

Notable people 

Matogjin is the birthplace of Demir Vlonjati and Qazim Ademi, famous singers and composers of the Albanian polyphonic music.

Sources 

Populated places in Selenicë
Villages in Vlorë County